Air traffic safety electronics personnel (ATSEP) is an International Civil Aviation Organization term for the electronic engineers involved with the creation and support of the ground-based electronic hardware and software systems used to support air navigation and air traffic management. In India they were known as CNSO (Communication navigation surveillance officer ).Airports Authority officers association India started celebrating CNSO day from 25 November 2013 later on from November 12, 2015, it started celebrated as ATSEP day. The association started first ever commemoration of ATSEP (CNSO) is now known as ATSEPA(l).

Often employed by Air Navigation Service Providers, ATSEP are mainly engineers, technocrats, hardware and software specialists who are responsible for the specification, procurement, installation, integration, calibration, maintenance, safety assurance and monitoring of these systems.  The equipment ranges from discrete specialist electronic systems to commercial off-the-shelf computer hardware running specialist software designed and maintained to provide a safety-of-life service to aircraft.  The systems provide communication and navigation services for aircraft, surveillance (e.g. radar), flight data processing and the brain behind air traffic control system.

The specialisms practised by ATSEP are heavily influenced by systems engineering and safety Engineering.  In many English-speaking countries, ATSEP are simply referred to as "engineers", even though the discipline encompasses a spectrum of professional engineers and highly trained technicians.

The International Federation of Air Traffic Safety Electronics Associations is the global organisation for the representation of ATSEPs on professional matters.

The International Federation of Air Traffic Safety Electronics Associations (IFATSEA) declared 12 November as International ATSEP day.

IFATSEA was in existence for more than 48 years.

References

Inclusion of Air Traffic Safety Electronics Personnel into Annex 1 ICAO - Assembly — 39th Session (25/8/2016)
The Integration of Air Traffic Safety Electronic Personnel into ICAO Annex 1 ICAO - Assembly — 39th Session (17/8/2016)
Next Generation of Air Traffic Safety Electronic Personnel (ATSEP) IFATSEA - NGAP symposium March 2010, Montreal

External links 
Official IFATSEA website)
Regional European ATSEP site)
ATEOA (Air Traffic Engineering Officers’ Association - Sri Lanka)
ATSEP Belgium Association webpage about the ATSEP 
ATSEP Competence

Occupations in aviation
Aviation licenses and certifications